is a railway station located in the city of Sagae, Yamagata Prefecture, Japan, operated by the East Japan Railway Company (JR East).

Lines
Sagae Station is served by the Aterazawa Line, and is located 15.3 rail kilometers from the terminus of the line at Kita-Yamagata Station.

Station layout
The station is an elevated station with a single island platform. The station has a Midori no Madoguchi staffed ticket office.

Platforms

History
Sagae Station began operation on 11 December 1921. With the privatization of the JNR on April 1, 1987, the station came under the control of the East Japan Railway Company. A new station building was completed in 2005.

Passenger statistics
In fiscal 2018, the JR portion of the station was used by an average of 905 passengers daily (boarding passengers only).

Surrounding area
 Sagae City Hall 
 Sagae Post Office
 Sagae Chubu Elementary School
 Sagae Elementary School

See also
List of Railway Stations in Japan

References

External links 

 Sagae Station (JR East) 

Railway stations in Yamagata Prefecture
Aterazawa Line
Railway stations in Japan opened in 1921
Sagae, Yamagata